Lo Wai is a village in Tsuen Wan District, Hong Kong.

Administration
Lo Wai is a recognized village under the New Territories Small House Policy.

History
Both the original Shek Wai Kok and Lo Wai villages have been described as the oldest villages of Tsuen Wan.

See also
 Tung Po Tor Monastery, a buddhist monastery in Lo Wai
 Yuen Yuen Institute, a Taoist temple in Lo Wai

References

External links

 Delineation of area of existing village Lo Wai (Tsuen Wan) for election of resident representative (2019 to 2022)

Villages in Tsuen Wan District, Hong Kong